Pulli is a village in Tori Parish, Pärnu County in southwestern Estonia.

Prior to the administrative reform of Estonian local governments in 2017, the village was part of Sauga Parish. Pulli settlement is one of the oldest known human settlements in Estonia, dating to around 9000 years BC, during the Mesolithic period.

Pulli has a railway station on the Edelaraudtee's western route.

References

 

Villages in Pärnu County